Dmitry Viktorovich Zatonsky (born March 30, 1971) is a Russian former ice hockey forward. He played 532 games and scored 171 goals in Russian championship. He scored most goals in season 1999-2000 (23 goals) and season 2004-2005 (26 goals) in Russian championship.

Honours
MHL:  1994 (With Lada)
Russian championship:  2004 (With Avangard)
European Champions cup:  2005 (With Avangard)

Career statistics

Regular season and playoffs

International

References

External links

1971 births
Living people
Sportspeople from Novosibirsk
Avangard Omsk players
HC Lada Togliatti players
HC Sibir Novosibirsk players
Russian ice hockey left wingers
Salavat Yulaev Ufa players